Fishia is a genus of moths of the family Noctuidae.

Species
 Fishia connecta (Smith, 1894)
 Fishia discors (Grote, 1881) (syn: Fishia evelina (French, 1888), Fishia hanhami Smith, 1909)
 Fishia dispar (Smith, 1900)
 Fishia illocata (Walker, 1857)
 Fishia nigrescens Hammond & Crabo, 2013
 Fishia yosemitae (Grote, 1873)

References
Natural History Museum Lepidoptera genus database
Fishia at funet

Cuculliinae